Balu Ganesh Ayyar (born 1961) is an Indian executive. He is the former CEO of Mphasis.

Early life 
Ayyar was born in Madhya Pradesh to Professor S.A. Balu and Brinda Balu. He finished his schooling in Madhya Pradesh and went on to complete his B.Com from Guru Nanak College, Chennai. He participated in debates and writing plays. He completed his chartered accountancy in 1985.

Career 
Ayyar started his career in a manufacturing company as a management trainee in internal auditing. He joined Hewlett Packard in 1989 with the responsibility of growing business in the APAC region. In 1999, he was appointed the president of Hewlett Packard India. From 2004 to 2008, he was vice president of the outsourcing services business unit for Asia-Pacific and Japan.

On 29 January 2009, Ayyar was appointed as CEO and executive director at Mphasis. Ayyar was involved with refreshing Mphasis's brand identity with the tagline ‘Unleash the Next’ in 2014. The $1 billion-plus IT services company has been looking at non HP related projects in banking, capital markets and insurance verticals to offset the drop in business from its parent company Hewlett Packard (HP). During his tenure, the company has acquired AIGSS, Fortify, Wyde Corporation, Digital Risk.

Some of the initiatives undertaken at Mphasis during Ayyar's tenure include
the launch of Kick Start Cabs, a cab service for senior citizens and people with disabilities, and partnership with Lokalex for a pilot program in rural education through IT.

In 2013, he was among the top 5 paid CEOs in India from the IT sector.

Ayyar is joining Cognizant as EVP for digital operations from 1 August 2019.

Awards 
2010: NDTV Profit Business Leadership Award
2011: Asia's Viewers Choice Award – CNBC Asia
2011: India Talent management award at the CNBC TV18
2015: Innovation and Excellence Award from Corporate Livewire
2016: Mid-Market CEO of the Year’ from CEO Connection Mid-market awards.

References

External links 
 How CEOs Stymie Their Own Digital Transformation at Wharton University of Pennsylvania 
 Transforming Corporate Cultures by Celebrating Failures at Wharton University of Pennsylvania
 Digital Transformation: Learning to Take the Fight to Pure-play Rivals at Wharton University of Pennsylvania
 The Digital Leader: Self-transformation for Long-term Success at Wharton University of Pennsylvania

Living people
1961 births
Businesspeople from Madhya Pradesh
Indian chief executives